Grigory Viktorovich Lepsveridze, known as Grigory Leps (born 16 July 1962 in Sochi), is a Russian singer-songwriter of Georgian origin. His musical style gradually changed from Russian chanson in his early years to soft rock recently. He's known for his low, strong baritone voice. People's Artist of Russia (2022). Grigory Leps reported the highest income of all singers in Russia in 2013 with $15 million, 2014 with $12 million and 2015 with $12.2 million.

Biography
Grigory Leps was born Grigory Lepsveridze in the city of Sochi, Russian SFSR, Soviet Union in an ethnically Georgian family. He finished music school in the class of Percussion instrument. After the army he started to play and sing in a few rock bands, and worked as a singer in restaurants.

He suffered from alcoholism and drug addiction, and to get far from that life he went to Moscow. There he started singing in restaurants, until he received a record deal, and in 1995 he released the album May God Keep You (Khrani vas Bog). The song "Natali" became a hit, but he didn't know that because he was hospitalized for drugs and alcoholism. The doctors told him that one more drop of any of the drugs could kill him. In 1997, he released his second album, A Whole Life (Tselaya zhizn), which had a few hits including "Chizhik", "Gololed", "A whole life".

In 2000, he released the album Thank You People, with the hits "Shelest" and "Nu i chto". At that album was seen the change in Leps's style, with him completely leaving the Shanson and moving to rock music. In 2002, he released the album On Strings of Rain (Na strunakh dozhdya), with a hit "Rumka vodki na stole".

In 2004, he released a cover album of songs written by Vladimir Vysotsky in rock versions, Parus. The song "Parus" had a video clip and the album took top places at the selling charts. The second part of the album, Vtoroy was released in 2007 with its presentation concert being held in the Kremlin hall. In 2005, he released a compilation album called Izbranoye... 10 let.

In 2006, he released two albums, both reaching high success. Labirint, with the hits Labirint and Vyuga, and the album V tsentre zemli, with the hit Zamerzayet Solntse. The premier concert for the V tsentre zemli album took place in the Luzhniki Stadium. In 2007, he released two compilations. I'm Alive (Ya zhivoy, videoclips), and All My Life – a Road (Vsya moya zhizn – doroga, best songs). In 2009, about the presentation of the album, "Waterfall ".

On 18 March 2022, Leps sang at Vladimir Putin's Moscow rally celebrating the annexation of Crimea by the Russian Federation from Ukraine and justifying the 2022 Russian invasion of Ukraine. The Presidential Administration of Russia put him on the list of singers who were recommended to be invited to state-sponsored events.

On 22 February 2023, Leps sang at Vladimir Putin's 2023 Moscow rally.

Musical style
Leps is known for his wide vocal range. He has a low growling voice. His style mixed rock music, pop music, and used to also have shanson in it.

Trivia

 Leps, a Georgian orthodox, always chose an apartment so a church would be seen through the window, or at least a road, because it "always leads to a church".
 He collects old books.
 He collects Icons, and for one of them he once gave his car. Among his collection he has an icon that belonged to the Romanovs, as well as another icon from the 15th century.

Connections with International Criminal Groups
In October 2013, the US Department of the Treasury blacklisted Grigory Leps, over links with an international criminal group. He was accused of being a money courier for the Brothers' Circle, which the Treasury describes as a Eurasian criminal organization chiefly based in countries of the former Soviet Union.

Sanctions
In December 2022 the EU sanctioned Grigory Leps in relation to the 2022 Russian invasion of Ukraine.

Awards

|-
! colspan="3" style="background: cyan;" | World Music Awards
|-

|-

Videos 
 1995 — «Натали»
 1995 — «Храни Вас Бог»
 1997 — «Раздумья мои» 
 1999 — «Первый день рожденья»
 2000 — «Крыса-Ревность»
 2001 — «Шелест»
 2002 — «Рюмка водки на столе»
 2002 — «Я верю, я дождусь»
 2004 — «Кровь, пот, слезы, любовь»
 2005 — «Ну и что» 
 2005 — «Вьюга» 
 2006 — «Она» 
 2006 — «Лабиринт» 
 2006 — «Замерзает солнце»
 2007 — «Я тебе не верю» duet with Irina Allegrova
 2007 — «Бессонница» 
 2008 — «Она не твоя» duet with Stas Piekha
 2009 — «Уходи красиво» (cover-version of Bryn Christopher's "The Quest")
 2009 — «Что может человек» 
 2010 — «Измены» 
 2010 — «Обернитесь» duet with Valery Meladze 
 2011 — «Вечерняя застольная» Trio with Alexander Rosenbaum and Joseph Kobzon
 2012 — «Реквием по любви» duet with Timati 
 2012 — «Водопадом» 
 2012 — «Лондон» duet with Timati 
 2013 — «Зеркала» duet with Ani Lorak 
 2014 — «Господи, дай мне сил» 
 2014 — «Бай-бай» duet with Natalia Vlasova
 2015 — «Бабосы боссам» duet with Green Grey

Song of the year

Discography
 Albums
 1995 – Натали (Natalie)
 1997 – Целая жизнь (Lifetime)
 2000 – Спасибо, люди... (Thanks, people ...)
 2002 – На струнах дождя... (On the strings of rain ...)
 2004 – Парус (Sail)
 2006 – Лабиринт (Maze/Labyrinth)
 2006 – В центре Земли (In the center of the Earth)
 2007 – Второй (Second)
 2009 – Водопад (Waterfall)
 2011 – Пенсне (Pince-nez)
 2011 – Берега чистого братства (Bank of pure brotherhood) together with singer Alexander Rosenbaum
 2012 – Полный вперед! (Full speed ahead)
 2014 – Гангстер No.1 (Gangster #1)
 2019 – ТыЧегоТакойСерьезный (WhyAreYouSoSerious)

 DVDs
 2005 – Парус Live (Sail Live) Concert at the State Kremlin Palace in Moscow 13 March 2004
 2007 – В центре Земли Live (In the center of the Earth Live) Concert in SC "Olympic" 16 November 2006
 2007 – Я – живой!  (I (am) alive) Collection of video clips
 2010 – Что может человек (What can a man) Sat ornik videos
 2010 – Водопад Live (Waterfall Live) Presentation album, "Waterfall", SC "Olympic" 20 November 2009, Full version concert
 2011 – Научись летать Live (Learn to fly) Presentation album, "Pince-nez", Crocus City Hall, 7 mat, Full version concert

 Collections
 2005 – Избранное... 10 лет (Favorites... 10 years)
 2007 – Вся жизнь моя – дорога... (All my life – the road ...)
 2010 – Берега. Избранное (Shore. Favorites)

References

External links
 
 Grigory Leps at the Forbes
 
Concert of Grigory Leps in Olympic Stadium, Moscow 2006
Concert of Grigory Leps in Olympic Stadium, Moscow 2009

Russian chanson
1962 births
Russian people of Georgian descent
Living people
People from Sochi
20th-century Russian singers
21st-century Russian singers
20th-century Russian male singers
21st-century Russian male singers
Russian National Music Award winners
Winners of the Golden Gramophone Award
Russian individuals subject to European Union sanctions